Cole Creek is a stream in Callaway and Montgomery counties in the U.S. state of Missouri. It is a tributary of Prairie Fork of the Loutre River.

Cole Creek has the name of a pioneer citizen.

See also
List of rivers of Missouri

References

Rivers of Callaway County, Missouri
Rivers of Montgomery County, Missouri
Rivers of Missouri